Rehema Namakula (born 24 April 1991), known professionally as Rema Namakula or simply Rema, is a Ugandan singer, songwriter and record producer.

Background and education 
Rema was born in Lubaga Hospital, on 24 April 1991, to the late Hamida Nabbosa and the late Mukiibi Ssemakula. She is the last-born in her family. She attended Kitante Primary School for her elementary school education. She studied at Saint Balikudembe Senior Secondary School for both O-Level and A-Level studies. Later, she joined Kyambogo University. which she never completed and says she plans to do so in future

Career 
During her Senior 6 vacation, she began singing karaoke. Later, she became a back-up singer to another Ugandan female musician Halima Namakula, who became her mentor. She continued her music career as a backup artist for Ugandan musician Bebe Cool in Gagamel, Bebe Cool's recording group. In 2013, Bebe Cool was watching television when he saw Rema talking about launching a solo album, which Bebe Cool didn't know about. So he fired her and she went solo. In 2013 she released "Oli Wange" which was written by Nince Henry which made her popular in the music industry of Uganda.

In 2016, Rema Namakula was selected to represent Uganda at the fourth season of Coke Studio Africa 2016. Other Ugandan recording artists selected included Lydia Jazmine, Eddy Kenzo and Radio and Weasel. Other participants in the invitation-only event included
2Baba (2Face Idibia) from Nigeria and Trey Songz from the United States.

Personal life 
Over time, Namakula began a romantic relationship with Ugandan recording artist Eddy Kenzo. On 26 December 2014, Namakula gave birth to a daughter at Paragon Hospital, in the Kampala neighborhood of Bugoloobi. Kenzo (real name Edrisa Musuuza), who has another daughter (Maya Musuuza) from a previous relationship, acknowledged being the father and named the newborn Aamaal Musuuza.

On 14 November 2019, Namakula introduced her new fiancé, Dr. Hamza Ssebunya, in a ceremony that took place at her home in Nabbingo, near Kampala. The introduction was a national affair, as thousands camped out along the procession route to her home.

On 7 November 2021, Namakula welcomed her second child. A baby girl named Aaliyah Ssebunya.

Partial discography 
 "Oli Wange"
 "Katonotono"
 "Lean On Me"
 "Lowooza Kunze"
 "Deep in Love"
 "Muchuuzi"
 "Atuuse"
 "Kukaliba"
 "Fire Tonight"
 "Ceaze and Sekkle"
 "Banyabo"
 "Loco" (featuring DJ Harold and Chike)
 "Akaffe Che"

Music Awards 
HiPipo Music Awards 2013: Won
 Best HiPipo Charts Artist
 Best Breakthrough Artist
 Best Female Artist
 Best R&B Song, "Oli Wange"

HiPipo Music Awards 2014: Won
Best female Artist of the Year
Best female Artist (Dancehall)
Best female RnB song – Kukaliba

References 

1991 births
Ganda people
Living people
Ugandan songwriters
21st-century Ugandan women singers
Kyambogo University alumni
People from Central Region, Uganda